KVGB 1590 AM is a radio station of the news and Talk radio format, broadcasting general interest talk programs from hosts such as Jim Bohannon, George Noory Dave Ramsey and Kim Komando, based in Great Bend, United States. It is owned by Eagle Communications Inc.

Eagle Communications owns other Kansas radio stations in Salina, Hutchinson, Hays, Great Bend, Pratt, Hoisington and Hill City.

One of the oldest radio stations in western Kansas, KVGB first signed on the air in the late 1940s. KVGB went to a 24-hour broadcast schedule on October 14, 2001.

External links
Official website

Talk radio stations in the United States
Radio stations established in 1949
VGB
1949 establishments in Kansas